Dragonfly is an album by American jazz composer and arranger Jimmy Giuffre which was released on the Italian Soul Note label in 1983.

Reception

Ron Wynn of Allmusic states: "Giuffre enters the 80s with a bang".

Track listing 
All compositions by Jimmy Giuffre except as indicated
 "Dragonfly" - 5:05
 "Cool" - 5:45
 "In Between" - 4:37
 "Moonlight" - 4:40
 "J to J" - 4:02
 "Sad Truth" - 3:10
 "Stella by Starlight" (Victor Young, Ned Washington) - 5:27
 "Squirrels" - 5:20

Personnel 
Jimmy Giuffre - soprano saxophone, tenor saxophone, clarinet, flute, bass flute
Pete Levin - Rhodes electric piano, Oberheim synthesizer, Moog synthesizer
Bob Nieske - electric bass 
Randy Kaye - percussion, marimba

References 

Jimmy Giuffre albums
1983 albums
Black Saint/Soul Note albums